Old Cape May County Courthouse Building is located in Cape May Court House, Cape May County, New Jersey, United States. The building was built in 1848 and added to the National Register of Historic Places on December 22, 1981.

It was replaced by the Cape May Courthouse in 1927.

See also
National Register of Historic Places listings in Cape May County, New Jersey
List of county courthouses in New Jersey

References

Courthouses on the National Register of Historic Places in New Jersey
Georgian architecture in New Jersey
Government buildings completed in 1848
C
C
National Register of Historic Places in Cape May County, New Jersey
New Jersey Register of Historic Places
Middle Township, New Jersey